Total Drama Island (sometimes shortened to TDI) is the first season of Total Drama, a Canadian animated comedy television series created by Tom McGillis and Jennifer Pertsch. The series premiered in Canada on Teletoon on July 8, 2007, and ran for 26 episodes, each 22 minutes in duration with a special 44-minute season finale.

Plot

Total Drama Island is set in the fictional titular reality show, which follows the competition of 22 unsuspecting and unwitting teenagers at Camp Wawanakwa, the most rundown, insect-infested, disgusting island in an unspecified area in Muskoka, Ontario. The campers participate in competitions and challenges that get more insane and dangerous each week to avoid being voted off the island by their fellow campers and teammates. At the end of the series, the winning contestant will receive C$100,000 (US$73,129.00). The competition is hosted by Chris McLean, assisted by the camp's chef, Chef Hatchet, who is also Chris's best friend despite being mistreated at times. Egotistical and immoral, unless something affects him legally, Chris places the show's contestants in various life-threatening challenges.

At the beginning of the season, the campers are placed into two groups of eleven, the "Screaming Gophers" and the "Killer Bass". In each episode, the teams participate in a challenge, in which one or more campers can win invincibility for their team. The losing team is called to the campfire that night, where they vote one of their members off the island. The camper with the most votes is eliminated from the competition. At this campfire, McLean passes out marshmallows to the campers who have not been voted off, while the one who does not get a marshmallow must walk down the Dock of Shame to the Boat of Losers, which will take them away from the island and they will "never, never, never, ever, ever, ever, come back, ever" according to Chris (this was proved a lie in Episode 15, "No Pain, No Game", when he brought Eva and Izzy back into the game).

In Episode 14, the teams are disbanded, so it is every camper for themselves, after which the challenges continue; the winner of each challenge then only receives invincibility for him or herself, whereupon the rest of the campers vote one camper without invincibility off the island. This process of elimination continues until two players remain. They are then subject to a final contest. Total Drama Island is a parody of the reality show Survivor. McLean is very similar to Survivor host Jeff Probst. This is the first season in which the winner does not get to keep the money, due to it being eaten by a shark in the episode "Total Drama Drama Drama Drama Island".

Episodes

Total Drama Island premiered on July 8, 2007, on the Teletoon channel. This season has 26 episodes, each 22 minutes long, and two special episodes. It was the third Cartoon Network show outside of Adult Swim and Toonami to have the U.S. rating of either "TV-PG" or "TV-PG-D", and a parental-guidance warning after every commercial break and at the beginning of the show (the first two being Sunday Pants and IGPX). Its rating in Canada was initially "G"; current broadcasts are rated "PG".

Source for list:

Episode finale variations
For every season, the show's producers create two alternate endings for the final episode, such that the winner seen in one country's broadcasts is the runner-up in other countries (and vice versa) where the show airs. Owen is the original winner in Canada, but he is also shown as the winner in Australia, Bulgaria, Croatia, Denmark, France, Hungary, Israel, Italy, Latin America and Brazil (Cartoon Network), the Middle East, the Netherlands, New Zealand, the Philippines, Portugal, Russia, Serbia, Singapore, Spain, South Africa, Turkey, United Kingdom, and the United States. Gwen is the original runner-up in Canada, but she is also the winner in Finland, Japan, Latin America and Brazil (Boomerang and TBS) Norway, Poland, Romania and Sweden.

Characters

Staff

Contestants
There are 22 original contestants who competed in Total Drama Island. They are Beth, Bridgette, Cody, Courtney, DJ, Duncan, Eva, Ezekiel, Geoff, Gwen, Harold, Heather, Izzy, Justin, Katie, Leshawna, Lindsay, Noah, Owen, Sadie, Trent, and Tyler. Many of the characters return in later seasons either as contestants or as guests.

Elimination Table

Color Key
  Finalist: This contestant made it to the final of the competition.
  Win: This contestant won the challenge and/or was immune from elimination.
  Safe: This contestant was safe from elimination.
  Low: This contestant was at risk of being eliminated.
  Eliminated: This contestant was eliminated.
  Eliminated: This contestant quit, was evacuated, or got disqualified.
  This contestant is out of the competition.

Production
Total Drama Island was developed and produced by Fresh TV, starting in 2006, with an early name for the series being Camp TV. The season was animated at Elliott Animation and was directed by Todd Kauffman and Mark Thornton. It was primarily targeted at twelve-to-eighteen-year-olds, and the creators, Tom McGillis and Jennifer Pertsch, studied what tweens liked and disliked about reality television shows in the writing process. McGillis said that they used a "countrywide online research project" to determine this demographic's likes. Fresh TV partners McGillis, Pertsch, Elliott and Irving produced the series. The budget for the series was US$8,000,000. It was animated in Flash, at Elliott Animation's studio in Toronto. Every cast and crew member on Total Drama Island had to sign a confidentiality agreement not to disclose who the winner was. All the characters were designed by Kauffman. Voice actors from the series 6teen have lent their voices for Total Drama Island. Christian Potenza, who played the character Jude on 6teen, played the role of host Chris McLean. Potenza said that the best part of the job was that his character could not be voted off the show. Emilie-Claire Barlow plays a recurring role as Chrissy on 6teen and plays Courtney on Total Drama Island. Barlow stated that Courtney was her favourite character that she had ever played. Other voice actors from 6teen include Julia Chantrey as Eva; Drew Nelson (Kai) as Duncan; Megan Fahlenbock (Jen) as Gwen; Adam Reid (Wayne) as Justin; Stephanie Anne Mills (Kirsten) as Lindsay and Katie; Rachel Wilson (Melinda Wilson) as Heather; and Scott McCord (Stone) as Owen and Trent.

Reception

Ratings
Carole Bonneau, the Vice President of Teletoon stated that Total Drama Island, along with 6teen were "consistently top performers" for audiences of ages 6–11, and also helped to bring in older viewers as well. When Total Drama Island aired on Cartoon Network, it performed very well; The Toronto Star reported that, "in some age groups [Total Drama Island showed] a 500% ratings increase in [its] time slot." On December 11, 2008, Total Drama Island garnered 3.5 million viewers. That year, the series was the top "regularly scheduled Thursday night program at 9 p.m. on all television throughout third quarter among kids 2-11, 6-11 and 9-14," according to the Animation World Network. On Memorial Day weekend of 2009, a marathon of Total Drama Island increased viewership in age groups 2–11, 6–11, and 9–14, each by 20% or more compared to the same week in 2008. As of 2011, Total Drama Island has aired in over 188 countries.

Critical reception
Total Drama Island has received generally positive reviews. The series was nominated for a Gemini Award for "Best Animated Program or Series", shared by Tom McGillis, Jennifer Pertsch, George Elliott and Brian Irving. Common Sense Media gave the show 4 out of 5 stars, deeming it an "enjoyable, smart show" and finding that it appealed to all demographics. Matthew Price of The Oklahoman gave a mixed review of the series, stating that it "starts unbelievably slowly", but deeming that the later episodes effectively spoofed reality shows. Debi Enker of The Age gave a negative review of the season's last episode, calling the art, design and writing "lamentable."

Public reaction
Total Drama Island received a score of 8.2 on Metacritic from users.

Media

DVD releases
A DVD was released by Warner Home Video on August 18, 2009, in the United States. It contains all of the 27 episodes (including TDI Rundown) of season one of this series in a 4 disc set, for a total of 594 minutes long. In addition, its bonus features (entitled as X-tras) are the audition tapes of twenty two campers, played after each of their respective eliminations, as well as Izzy's second audition tape and her exclusive interview with Chris (the latter of which is shown after Eva's second elimination). In Australia, Total Drama Island is on Region 4 DVD as separate volumes. This series of discs contains the widescreen version with uncut scenes and original dialogue, as seen on Teletoon and ABC3. In reviewing the DVD for season, Matthew Price of The Oklahoman wrote that while the show started out "unbelievably slowly," the series became more interesting as campers began getting voted off. Price also praised the parody of reality shows. In another review of the DVD, Jeffrey Kauffman of DVD Talk wrote that the character development was compelling and that the parody of reality shows were very funny. Mac McEntire of DVD Verdict praised the character development as well, but noted that the show sometimes sinks to "lowbrow gross-outs". Both Kauffman and McEntire recommended the series DVD.

Total Drama Island: Totally Interactive!
Total Drama Island: Totally Interactive! was an online game in Canada and the US marketed in conjunction with the television series. It was produced by Xenophile Media. By registering a free account, the player could play games using a customizable avatar to earn points for marshmallows. Marshmallows are used as money in the game so the player can buy in-game items. The player who earned the most points had their avatar make a cameo appearance in the season finale. The games were based on the challenges in the show. Total Drama Island: Totally Interactive! was nominated for an Interactive Emmy Award in 2007. However, the website is no longer available, as it was replaced by Total Drama Online and the Teletoon and Cartoon Network official sites.

See also

Mockumentary

Notes

References

External links

Official Total Drama Island blog
Total Drama Island Interactive
totaldramaisland.com
Fresh TV announces Total Drama: The Musical

Island
2007 Canadian television seasons
2008 Canadian television seasons
2000s Canadian animated television series
2000s Canadian satirical television series
Canadian adult animated comedy television series
Canadian children's animated comedy television series
Television shows set in Ontario
Television shows filmed in Toronto
Canadian flash animated television series
Canadian mockumentary television series